Victoria Avenue is a street in the central business district of Perth, Western Australia.

At the northern end of Victoria Avenue is Victoria Square enclosing St Mary's Cathedral.

South from Victoria Square, it crosses Hay Street, and is the point where St Georges Terrace and Adelaide Terrace meet. It continues south to  Riverside Drive next to the Swan River.

Victoria Avenue is frequently used in the annual Channel 7 Christmas Pageant.

Buildings
St John's Pro-Cathedral is on the eastern side just north of the Hay Street intersection.

On the corner of Victoria Avenue and St Georges Terrace, a school named Christian Brothers College existed. It was located at that site until 1961, when it was demolished. The site is currently occupied by the Duxton Hotel.

See also

References

 
Streets in Perth central business district, Western Australia
Victoria Square, Perth